Thomas Elmer Huff (January 8, 1938, in Tarrant County, Texas, United States – January 16, 1990, in Fort Worth, Texas) was a best-selling American author of 23 gothic and romance novels as T. E. Huff and Tom E. Huff and under the female pen names Edwina Marlow, Beatrice Parker, Katherine St. Clair, and Jennifer Wilde.

Careers
Thomas Elmer Huff was born on January 8, 1938, in Tarrant County, Texas, United States. He graduated from Poly High School and from Texas Wesleyn College in 1960. He spent several years as English teacher at R. L. Paschal High School before becoming a novelist.

He wrote gothic novels for nine years under the pseudonyms Edwina Marlow, Beatrice Parker, T. E. Huff, and Katherine St. Clair. In 1976, Huff adopted the pseudonym Jennifer Wilde when he began writing historical romance novels.  His first release, Love's Tender Fury, had 41 printings in its first five years, and his second historical romance, Dare to Love, spent 11 weeks on the New York Times paperback bestseller list.  His historical romances were noted for being written in first-person, from the heroine's perspective.  Many of his books also featured multiple male protagonists, and "the man who first captures the heroine's heart isn't always the one who ends up with it."

Huff earned a Career Achievement Award in 1987-1988 from Romantic Times.

Huff died suddenly of a massive heart failure on 16 January 1990 in Fort Worth, Texas, where he was buried.

Bibliography
Some of his novels are reedited under the pseudonym of Jennifer Wilde or under different titles

As Edwina Marlow

Single novels
The Master of Phoenix Hall (1968)
Falconridge (1969)
When Emmalyn Remembers (1970)
The Lady of Lyon House (1970)
Danger At Dahlkari (1975)
Midnight At Mallyncourt (1975)

As Beatrice Parker

Single novels
Come to Castlemoor (1970)
Betrayal At Blackcrest (1971)
Stranger By the Lake (1971)
Wherever Lynn Goes (1975)
Jamintha (1975)

As T. E. Huff

Single novels
Nine Bucks Row (1973) aka Susannah, Beware
Meet a Dark Stranger (1974) aka Whisper in the Darkness

As Katherine St. Clair

Single novel
Room Beneath the Stairs (1975)

As Jennifer Wilde

Marietta Danver Trilogy
Love's Tender Fury (1976)
Love Me, Marietta (1981)
When Love Commands (1984)

Single novels
Dare to Love (1978)
Once More, Miranda (1983)
Angel in Scarlet (1986)
The Slipper (1987)
They Call Her Dana (1989)

As Tom E. Huff

Single novel
Marabelle (1980)

See also
List of romantic novelists

References

20th-century American novelists
American male novelists
American romantic fiction writers
1938 births
1990 deaths
20th-century American male writers